ANR College is an institution of higher education in Gudivada, Andhra Pradesh, India.

It is an autonomous college affiliated to Nagarjuna University.
So present principal is Dr.P.Rajasekhar

External links
Official website

Colleges in Andhra Pradesh
Universities and colleges in Krishna district
Educational institutions in India with year of establishment missing